Vriesea ospinae var. gruberi is a variety of flowering plant in the family Bromeliaceae.

References

H.Luther, J. Bromeliad Soc. 42: 118 (1992).

ospinae var. gruberi